Cyrilla racemiflora, the sole species in the genus Cyrilla, is a flowering plant in the family Cyrillaceae, native to warm temperate to tropical regions of the Americas, from the southeastern United States (coastal areas from southeastern Texas east to southeastern Virginia), south through the Caribbean, Mexico (Oaxaca only) and Central America to northern Brazil and Venezuela in South America. Common names include swamp cyrilla, swamp titi, palo colorado, red titi, black titi, white titi, leatherwood, ironwood, he huckleberry, and myrtle.

Habitat
Can be found in rainforests, swamps, along streams, bogs, bayheads, backwaters, wet prairies, low pinelands, pocosins, flatwood depressions, preferring acidic, sandy, or peaty soils.

Description
It is most recognizable from its white flowers which are noticeable on the plant during the summer months. It is primarily evergreen, but during the autumn months some of the leaves turn a brilliant red before falling, and plants at the northern edge of its range tend to be deciduous. The bark of large individuals is a reddish-brown colored thin bark often shaggy in appearance. The bark of smaller individuals is gray to brown, smoothish and lightly fissured.

Taxonomy
Although generally treated as a single variable species, some botanists in the past have split Cyrilla racemiflora into several species. Synonyms include C. antillana, C. arida, C. brevifolia, C. caroliniana, C. cubensis, C. fuscata, C. nipensis, C. nitidissima, C. parvifolia, C. perrottetii, C. polystachia.

References

USGS Website about Cyrilla
Florida Vascular Plants: list of synonyms

Monotypic Ericales genera
Ericales
Cloud forest flora of Mexico
Trees of the Southeastern United States
Trees of the Caribbean
Trees of Central America
Trees of northern South America